David Roxburgh is the Prince Alwaleed Bin Talal Professor of Islamic art history at Harvard University.

Biography
Roxburgh grew up in the Scottish Borders and went on to study at Edinburgh University and Edinburgh College of Art, where he earned an MA in Fine Art in 1988. He received a Thouron Scholarship and was admitted to the Ph.D. program in History of Art at the University of Pennsylvania, where he graduated in 1996. He began teaching at Harvard the same year and was granted tenure in 2003. He has researched primary written sources, manuscript painting, book art, calligraphy, Timurid art and architecture, exchanges between China and Islamic lands, travel narratives, and histories of collecting, exhibitions, and museums.

Works
 The Persian album, 1400-1600: From Dispersal to Collection
 Traces of the Calligrapher: Islamic Calligraphy in Practice, c. 1600-1900 with Mary McWilliams
 Prefacing the Image: The Writing of Art History in Sixteenth-Century Iran
 Writing the Word of God: Calligraphy and the Qur'an

References

Harvard University faculty
Year of birth missing (living people)
Living people
Alumni of the University of Edinburgh
Edinburgh College of Art
University of Pennsylvania alumni
Historians of Islamic art